Tune in for Love, is a 2019 South Korean romance film directed by Jung Ji-woo and starring Kim Go-eun and Jung Hae-in. It was released in South Korea on August 28, 2019, and globally via Netflix on November 5, 2019.

Plot 

The setting is in the 1990s and reflects on the IMF Crisis of 1997. Mi-soo, a hardworking part-time worker at a bakery, indirectly exchanges stories with Hyun-woo on a radio program. Both fall in love and continue to cross paths, but timing is not in their favor.

In 1994, Hyun-woo comes into the bakery Mi-soo works at before opening time and asks her if they sell anything that contains soy. Mi-soo suggests soy milk, but realizes they don't have soy milk and refers him to the grocery store down the street. As Hyun-woo is leaving, Mi-soo and another employee, Eun-ja, Mi-soo’s close friend, watch as he walks away, assuming he is newly released from prison. Later, Hyun-woo returns and applies as a part-timer for the bakery. He gets the job and he and Mi-soo begin to work together. Hyun-woo, Mi-soo, and Eun-ja spend a lot of time together and opening up to each other. During winter, Hyun-woo and Mi-soo put out a Christmas tree in front of the bakery. The two share a sentimental moment outside as Mi-soo tells him that her mother always wished to share happiness with the rest of the community.

Around Christmas, construction for new apartment buildings begins in their neighborhood and old friends of Hyun-woo find him and stop by. Their presence disrupts the quiet peace of the bakery and eventually, Eun-ja asks them to leave. Hyun-woo is about to leave with them and asks Eun-ja if he can get his pay in advance. Mi-soo and Eun-ja wonder if he'll ever come back. Later that night, Hyun-woo and his friends are eating at a soju bar and have a solemn moment to remember their friend, Jyeong-hyeop who passed away. A group of strangers passes by them and one remarks it seems like a funeral. One of Hyun-woo's friends gets angry and picks a fight with the stranger, ending up with all of them in a fight. Mi-soo waits in the bakery for Hyun-woo to return, but he never does.

In 1997, the bakery has closed. Mi-soo meets with a college counselor and confides she didn't get a job at any of the big companies. He tells her she has two options: a temporary gig working for a popular radio show or a stable job at newsletter editor company. She decides the latter. She visits Eun-ja, who is now working at a noodle shop, and shares the good news with her. Meanwhile, Hyun-woo is working as a furniture mover. After his shift, his coworker asks if Hyun-woo can escort his elderly mother home and Hyun-woo obliges. As he is escorting the old woman home, Mi-soo stops by the old bakery. Hyun-woo notices Mi-soo and tells her to wait for him there. She agrees and Hyun-woo returns, both engaging in small talk. The two reconnect and Mi-soo asks if he wants to visit Eun-ja's noodle shop the next day. Hyun-woo tells her about his military service which begins tomorrow and offers to walk her home. When they arrive at Mi-soo's apartment, the two spend time together in her apartment and eventually, Hyun-woo stays the night. Mi-soo admits on the day he left, she waited for him to return and Hyun-woo tells her that he wanted to return, but his probation was revoked due to the bar fight.

In the morning, Mi-soo wakes up before him and signs him up for an email account. She gives it to him as he departs and tells him to keep in contact with her this way. The two share a brief and awkward kiss before heading off in their separate direction. Later that night, Mi-soo realizes that she forgot to give him the password to the email, which was her code to the apartment.

In 2000, the bakery has been turned into a real estate agency office and the new apartment complexes have been built. Mi-soo is miserable at her newsletter editing job, where the machinery is loud and she frequently works overtime. She continued sending emails to Hyun-woo, even though he can't open his email. Hyun-woo was just released from military service and tries to find Mi-soo, only to find out that she has moved. He decides to move into her old apartment and as he is signing the lease, he sees her old apartment code and finally gets into his email account. Mi-soo is overjoyed to find she has a way to contact him and asks for his number, so she can call him the next day. The next day, she calls him and schedules a meet up. However, an angry mob storms Hyun-woo's job, breaking his phone. Mi-soo tries to call him many times, but is unable to. Later, Mi-soo emails him to say that it was a good thing that they didn't meet, since she isn't in the mood to catch up and act happy. She hates herself and admits that the only that has made her happy these days was Hyun-woo figuring out the password. She tells him to get in touch with her when something good happens.

Five years later, Mi-soo is now happy at her new book publishing job. Her boss takes her to a book shop, where she finds out that the new book she published is a top seller and they rejoice together. Meanwhile, Hyun-woo now works at a video editing startup that is moving in above where she works. The two reconnect yet again and Hyun-woo brings her to his apartment. Surprised, Mi-soo looks around before finally telling him that she is happy to see him. They start dating and Mi-soo takes three days off work to spend time with Hyun-woo. One night, Hyun-woo asks if she's still scared of her, since she used to be when they were younger. She shakes her head and the two kiss and passionately make love. Later, they visit Eun-ja, who has gotten married and has a step-daughter that causes her trouble. As Eun-ja and Hyun-woo are reconnecting, a student calls for Eun-ja, telling her her daughter is about to get beaten up. Eun-ja and Hyun-woo go, finding Mi-soo apprehending Eun-ja's daughter for smoking cigarettes. Mi-soo asks why she lets her daughter treat her badly and cause so much trouble. Eun-ja calms her down and serves Mi-soo and Hyun-woo food. As they leave Eun-ja, Mi-soo comments that Eun-ja could probably tell that they were dating.

The two continue to spend time together. At his work, Hyun-woo has a picture of Mi-soo that he took. Mi-soo also recommends Hyun-woo as a video editor for Yoo Yeol's new visual radio show. Meanwhile, Mi-soo's boss tells her that he will get her to fall for him. One day, Hyun-woo goes to return comic books and his old friends find him. It turns out that it's the tenth anniversary of Jyeong-hyeop's death, for which Hyeon-o was blamed and imprisoned for. They were playing around on the rooftop as children and Jyeong-hyeop fell down, so Hyun-woo was suspected of pushing him off. The group drives to Jyeong-hyeop's old house, where they deliver money to his sister. His sister tells them to leave and Hyeon-o tries to tell her that he is innocent, but she ignores him. Hyun-woo leaves his phone in his friend's car when he returns home and Mi-soo calls, only to hear that one of his friends has it. She meets with Hyun-woo's old friend to pick up the phone and learns about Hyun-woo's past.

Without Hyun-woo's knowledge, Mi-soo goes to visit Jyeong-hyeop's house, but his family has moved. Later that night, Mi-soo tells Hyun-woo what she learned and asks if everything will be okay now. Hyun-woo is devastated, as he prayed that Mi-soo would never find out, so he could try to live a normal, peaceful life without his past haunting him. Mi-soo tells him that he never told her and that she was tired of seeing him so anxious. She begs him not to leave, but he goes off. He finds his friend that told her about Jyeong-hyeop. The two beat each other up, and Hyun-woo visits Eun-ja's noodle shop. He returns home to find Mi-soo gone.
The next day Hyun-woo returns to his old workplace because he left his picture of Mi-soo there, but it has been bought by Mi-soo's boss. He meets her boss, who tells him that he has the picture of Mi-soo at his apartment and that Hyun-woo and Mi-soo aren't happy together, so Mi-soo deserves someone better. Hyun-woo admits his dislike for her boss and asks if he will find Mi-soo if he follows her boss's car. This makes her boss laugh and he drives off with Hyun-woo chasing after him. Mi-soo gets picked up by her boss and sees Hyun-woo running after the car. She asks her boss to stop and she leaves the car to speak with Hyun-woo. Hyun-woo confesses that he loves her, but Mi-soo only tells him to stop running. Heartbroken, Hyun-woo breaks down into tears as Mi-soo drives away.

A few days later, Mi-soo visits Eun-ja. Eun-ja makes her doughnuts, but tells her that it doesn't taste the same anymore. Mi-soo replies that everything in the world has changed, except the taste of her doughnuts. They reminisce and Eun-ja tells her about the night Hyun-woo visited. She says that Hyun-woo thanked Eun-ja for trusting him, even though his grandmother, aunt, and teacher never believed him.
Hyun-woo starts his job as the video editor for Yoo Yeol's show (a popular radio show) and Yoo Yeol asks if he has anyone he wants to give a shout out to. Mi-soo tunes in and hears that Hyun-woo gave a shout out to her on the show and goes over to the studio. She finds Hyun-woo packing up and smiles at seeing him. Hyun-woo notices her and takes a picture of her as she smiles at him.

Cast 
 Kim Go-eun as Kim Mi-soo
 Jung Hae-in as Cha Hyun-woo
 Kim Gook-hee as Eun-Ja
 Jung Yoo-jin as Hyun-Joo
 Kwon Eun-soo as Kwon Eun-soo	
 Park Hae-joon as Jong-woo
 Kim Hyun as Kim Hyun-sook
 Kim Dae-gon as Real estate agency owner
 Shim Dal-gi as Eun-ja's daughter Geum-yi
 Yoo Yeol as himself (special appearance)

Production 
 Kim Go-eun has previously worked together with director Jung Ji-woo in her debut film A Muse in 2012.
 Kim Go-eun has previously acted with Jung Hae-in in Guardian: The Lonely and Great God.
 The filming of the movie lasted for three months from September 1 to December 14, 2018.

Reception 
Tune in for Love set a box office record for a romance film upon its opening day of August 28, 2019, garnering 173,562 admissions and surpassing the record previously held by A Werewolf Boy. 
 The film was also the number one film in the South Korean box office during the week of September 1, 2019. In November, Tune in for Love was screened at the London East Asia Film Festival, where Jung Hae-in won a popularity award.

Awards and nominations

References

External links 
 
 
 

2019 films
2019 romance films
South Korean romance films
Films set in Seoul
Films shot in Seoul
Films directed by Jung Ji-woo
2010s Korean-language films
2010s South Korean films